Poor White is an American novel by Sherwood Anderson, published in 1920. An episode in the novel inspired Bertold Brecht's poem "Kohlen für Mike" ("Coal for Mike"), published in his 1939 collected Svendborger Gedichte.

Plot introduction
It is the story of an inventor, Hugh McVey, who rises from poverty on the banks of the Mississippi River.  The novel shows the influence of industrialism on the rural heartland of America.

References

External links
 Project Gutenberg edition of Poor White
 

1920 American novels
Social class in the United States
Novels by Sherwood Anderson
Works about White Americans
Working class in the United States
Working-class literature